Valencia Football Club or Valencia Club de Fútbol may refer to:

 Valencia CF, a Spanish professional football club based in Valencia playing in La Liga
 Valencia CF (youth), "Juvenil A", the under-19 team of Valencia CF
 Valencia Féminas CF, previously AD DSV Colegio Alemán, a Spanish women's football team from Valencia
 Huracán Valencia CF, a Spanish football team based in Torrent, Valencia
 Valencia FC (Haiti), a Haitian football club
 F.C. Municipal Valencia, a Honduran football club
 Club Valencia, a Maldivian football club
 Carabobo FC, a Venezuelan football team formerly known as Valencia FC